What Am I Gonna Do is a song by American singer Tyrese Gibson. It was written by Gibson, Scott Carter and Trevor Jobs for his second album 2000 Watts (2001), while production was helmed by Carter and Jobs under their production moniker Jake & Trey. The song served as the second single from 2000 Watts and reached number 71 on the US Billboard Hot 100 and number 24 on the US Hot R&B/Hip-Hop Songs chart.

Track listings

Credits and personnel
 Scott Carter – backing vocals, producer, writer
 Tyrese Gibson – vocals, writer
 Trevor Jobs – producer, writer
 Frank Jordan – backing vocals
 Jean-Marie Horvat – mixing

Charts

Weekly charts

Year-end charts

References

2001 songs
2001 singles
Tyrese Gibson songs
RCA Records singles
Songs written by Tyrese Gibson